LEN is the European governing body for aquatic sports affiliated to FINA — it is the Continental Association for Europe. It was formally organized in 1927 in Bologna, and since 2015 is headquartered in Nyon.

LEN comprises 52 national swimming federations in Europe, and includes Israel which for Olympic-sport purposes is grouped with Europe. LEN is overseen by an elected Bureau (board) composed of Members representing 17 different Federations. LEN oversees aquatic sports in Europe: diving, swimming, open water swimming, synchronized swimming and water polo.

Events

Championships
LEN organizes one championship (European Aquatics Championships), involving three of the five LEN disciplines (swimming, diving and synchronized swimming).
 European Aquatics Championships (held in even years; includes swimming, diving, synchronized swimming and Masters)

Discipline championships
LEN organizes five more discipline championships (swimming (25m), diving, water polo, artistic swimming, and open water).
Swimming (25m): European Short Course Swimming Championships (run every year, from 2015 run every second year)
Diving: European Diving Championships (run every second year since 2009)
Water Polo: European Water Polo Championship (run every second year)
Artistic Swimming: European Artistic Swimming Championships (2023)
Open Water: European Open Water Championships (run every second year since 2016)

Junior championships
LEN also runs various competitions restricted to a younger age:
Swimming: European Junior Swimming Championships (run every year)
Diving: European Junior Diving Championships (run every year)
Water Polo: U19 and U17 European Water Polo Championship (run every second year)
Artistic Swimming: European Junior Artistic Swimming Championships (run every year)
Open Water: European Junior Open Water Championships (run every year)

Masters championships
Swimming: European Masters Swimming Championships (run every second year)

Member federations 

The following national federations are part of LEN (Russian and Belarusian athletes and officials are, however, banned from every FINA event through the end of 2022):

Member federation bans
On 3 March 2022, LEN indefinitely banned Russians and Belarusians, and the corresponding LEN member federations, from competing at or officiating any LEN event to show support for Ukraine in the 2022 Russian invasion of Ukraine in addition to banning LEN events from being held in Russia and Belarus.

LEN European water polo players of the year

Men
2008: 
2009: 
2010: 
2011: 
2012: 
2013: 
2014: 
2015: 
2016: 
2017: 
2018: 
2019: 
2020: Not awarded due to COVID-19 pandemic
2021:

Women
2008: 
2009: 
2010: 
2011: 
2012: 
2013: 
2014: 
2015: 
2016: 
2017: 
2018: 
2019: 
2020: Not awarded due to COVID-19 pandemic

See also 

Swimming
International Swimming Federation – FINA
List of swimming competitions

References

External links
LEN Official Website.

 
Swimming organizations
 
Sports governing bodies in Europe
1927 establishments in Europe
European sports federations
Sports organizations established in 1927